Nathalie Krieg (born 21 October 1977) is a Swiss former competitive figure skater. She is the 1993 & 1994 Swiss national champion. She represented Switzerland at the 1994 Winter Olympics where she placed 16th. Krieg competed three times at the World Championships, with a highest placement of 14th in 1994, and four times at the European Championships, with a highest placement of 10th in 1994.

Results

References

 Sports-reference profile
 Skatabase: 1990s Worlds Results
 Skatabase: 1990s Europeans Results
 Skatabase: 1990s Olympics Results

Swiss female single skaters
Olympic figure skaters of Switzerland
Figure skaters at the 1994 Winter Olympics
1977 births
Living people